Isoetes appalachiana, commonly known as the Appalachian quillwort (not to be confused with its close relative Isoetes engelmannii, which shares the same common name), is an aquatic pteridophyte that is widely distributed in the eastern United States. It is most frequently encountered in wetlands at low to middle elevations of the Appalachian Mountains in Pennsylvania, though its range extends from there south to Florida and Alabama along the eastern slopes of the mountains. It is a tetraploid and is grouped in the Isoetes engelmannii complex.

References

External links
United States Department of Agriculture Plants Profile

appalachiana
Flora of the Eastern United States
Plants described in 1997
Aquatic plants